The Jessie Richardson Theatre Award (commonly known as the Jessie Awards) is given to recognize achievement in professional theatre in Vancouver, British Columbia. The Jessies are presented by the Jessie Richardson Theatre Award Society, at an annual ceremony. The awards are named after Jessie Richardson, co-founder of the Playhouse Holiday Theatre, local actor, director and designer.

The rules for the Jessie Awards are set forth by the Jessie Review Committee each year, which applies for each season only.

Awards

2019

Large Theatre

Outstanding Performance by an Actor – Large Theatre: Félix Beauchamp, ‘’Le Soulier’’, Théâtre la Seizième
Outstanding Performance by an Actress – Large Theatre: Colleen Wheeler, Timon of Athens, Bard on the Beach Shakespeare Festival
Outstanding Performance by an Actor in a Supporting Role – Large Theatre: Adam Grant Warren, Kill Me Now, Touchstone Theatre
Outstanding Performance by an Actress in a Supporting Role – Large Theatre: Nora McLellan, The Matchmaker, Arts Club Theatre Company
Outstanding Lighting Design – Large Theatre: Itai Erdal, The Curious Incident of the Dog in the Night-Time, Arts Club Theatre Company
Outstanding Set Design – Large Theatre: Drew Facey, Timon of Athens, Bard on the Beach Shakespeare Festival
Outstanding Costume Design – Large Theatre: Barbara Clayden, Lysistrata, Bard on the Beach Shakespeare Festival
Outstanding Sound Design or Original Composition – Large Theatre: Malcolm Dow, Le Soulier, Théâtre la Seizième
Georgia Straight Outstanding Direction – Large Theatre: Esther Duquette & Gilles Poulin-Denis, Le Soulier, Théâtre la Seizième
Outstanding Production – Large Theatre: Kamloopa, The Cultch – (in partnership with Western Canada Theatre, Persephone Theatre and Gordon Tootoosis Nīkānīwin Theatre, and in collaboration with National Arts Centre Indigenous Theatre)
Outstanding Production - Musical – Large Theatre: As You Like it, Bard on the Beach Shakespeare Festival
Significant Artistic Achievement – Large Theatre: Kim Senklip Harvey & Lindsay Lachance, Kamloopa, The Cultch – (in partnership with Western Canada Theatre, Persephone Theatre and Gordon Tootoosis Nīkānīwin Theatre, and in collaboration with National Arts Centre Indigenous Theatre) for Outstanding decolonization of theatre spaces and practices.

Small Theatre

Outstanding Performance by an Actor – Small Theatre: Warren Kimmel, Sweeney Todd: The Demon of Fleet Street, The Snapshots Collective
Outstanding Performance by an Actress – Small Theatre: Colleen Winton, Sweeney Todd: The Demon of Fleet Street, The Snapshots Collective
Outstanding Performance by an Actor in a Supporting Role – Small Theatre: Oliver Castillo, Sweeney Todd: The Demon of Fleet Street, The Snapshots Collective
Outstanding Performance by an Actress in a Supporting Role – Small Theatre: Alannah Ong, The Ones We Leave Behind, Vancouver Asian Canadian Theatre
Outstanding Lighting Design – Small Theatre: James Proudfoot, Camera Obscura (hungry ghosts) , the frank theatre company/Queer Arts Festival
Outstanding Set Design – Small Theatre: Marshall McMahen, Les Filles du Roi, Fugue Theatre/Raven Theatre/Urban Ink/The Cultch
Outstanding Costume Design – Small Theatre: Marshall McMahen & Konwahonwá:wi Stacey, Les Filles du Roi, Fugue Theatre/Raven Theatre/Urban Ink/The Cultch
Outstanding Sound Design or Original Composition – Small Theatre: Corey Payette & Kyra Soko, Les Filles du Roi, Fugue Theatre/Raven Theatre/Urban Ink/The Cultch
Outstanding Direction – Small Theatre: Corey Payette, Les Filles du Roi, Fugue Theatre/Raven Theatre/Urban Ink/The Cultch
Outstanding Production – Small Theatre: Camera Obscura (hungry ghosts) , the frank theatre company/Queer Arts Festival
Outstanding Production – Musical – Small Theatre: Sweeney Todd: The Demon of Fleet Street, The Snapshots Collective
Significant Artistic Achievement – Small Theatre: Molly MacKinnon & Christine Quintana, Never the Last – Delinquent Theatre for Outstanding interdisciplinary collaboration involving the imaginative integration of dance, live musical performance and theatre 

Theatre for Young Audiences

Outstanding Performance – Theatre for Young Audiences: Jake Walker, Jack and the Magic Bean, Presentation House Theatre
Outstanding Design – Theatre for Young Audiences: Shizuka Kai, Jessica Oostergo, Brad Trenaman, Salmon Girl – Raven Spirit Dance, Ensemble Design (set, costume, lighting)
Outstanding Artistic Creation – Theatre for Young Audiences: Kayla Dunbar, Elephant & Piggie’s “We Are in a Play”, Carousel Theatre for Young People
Outstanding Production – Theatre for Young Audiences: Elephant & Piggie’s “We Are in a Play”, Carousel Theatre for Young People
Significant Artistic Achievement – Theatre for Young Audiences: Jack and the Magic Bean, Presentation House Theatre for Outstanding risky and improvised audience engagement

Additional Awards

Outstanding Original Script: David Paquet, Le Soulier (The Shoe), Théâtre la Seizième
Critic’s Choice Innovation Award: Lysistrata, Bard on the Beach Shakespeare Festival
Vancouver Now Representation and Inclusion Award: Heather Redfern and The Cultch
Patron of the Arts Award: Grant Burnyeat
Mary Phillips Prize for Behind the Scenes Achievement: Stephane Kirkland
Sam Payne Award for the Most Promising Newcomer: Taran Kootenhayoo
John Moffat & Larry Lilo Prize: Andrew Wheeler
GVPTA Career Achievement Award: David Diamond
Sydney Risk Prize: Kamloopa by Kim Senklip Harvey
Colin Campbell Award for Excellence in Technical Theatre: Adrian Muir
Ray Michal Prize for Most Promising New Director: Marie Farsi

2020

2020 awards and nominations are from the following sources: 

Large theatre

Outstanding Performance by an Actress in a Lead Role: Deena Aziz, A Thousand Splendid Suns, |Arts Club Theatre Company (in partnership with Royal Manitoba Theatre Centre)
Outstanding Performance by an Actor in a Lead Role: Robert Salvador, Best of Enemies, Pacific Theatre
Outstanding Performance by an Actress in a Supporting Role: Tess Degenstein, Noises Off, Arts Club Theatre Company
Outstanding Performance by an Actor in a Supporting Role: John Ullyatt, Mathilda, Arts Club Theatre Company (in partnership with Citadel Theatre & Royal Manitoba Theatre Centre)
Outstanding Set Design: Drew Facey, Cost of Living, Arts Club Theatre Company (in partnership with Citadel Theatre)
Outstanding Costume Design: Cory Sincennes, Shakespeare in Love, Bard on the Beach Shakespeare Festival
Outstanding Sound Design or Original Composition: Alessandro Juliani, The Great Leap, Arts Club Theatre Company
Outstanding Production - Play: Noises Off, Arts Club Theatre Company
Outstanding Production - Musical: Sound of Music, Arts Club Theatre Company

Significant Artistic Achievement

Outstanding Innovative and Immersive Storytelling: Alley Theatre and Touchstone Theatre, Inheritance: A Pick-The-Path Experience Alley (in association with Vancouver Moving Theatre and Community Partnership with Vancouver Aboriginal Friendship Centre)
Outstanding Projection Design: Chimerik 似不像, The Great Leap, Arts Club Theatre Company
Outstanding Video and Projection Design: Emily Soussana, Chief Lady Bird, Chrystal Sparrow, & Carrielynn Victor, Skyborn: A Land Reclamation Odyssey, Savage Society (presented by The Cultch)
Outstanding Choreography: Tara Cheyenne Friedenberg, Cipher, Arts Club Theatre Company (in partnership with Vertigo Theatre)
Outstanding Audience Engagement Through the Use of Technology: Théâtre la Seizième, Le NoShow, Vancouver Théâtre la Seizième (in partnership with Théâtre DuBunker and le Collectif Nous Sommes ici (Québec)

Small theatre

Outstanding Performance by an Actress in a Lead Role: Jillian Fargey, The Father, The Search Party
Outstanding Performance by an Actor in a Lead Role: Kevin McNulty, The Father, The Search Party
Outstanding Performance by an Actress in a Supporting Role: Elizabeth Kirkland, The Sea, Slamming Door Artist Collective
Outstanding Performance by an Actor in a Supporting Role: Chris Francisque, Superior Donuts, Ensemble Theatre Company
Outstanding Lighting Design: Itai Erdal, The Father, The Search Party
Outstanding Set Design: Amir Ofek, The Father, The Search Party
Outstanding Costume Design: Christina Sinosich & Donnie Tejani, Company, Raincity Theatre
Outstanding Sound Design or Original Composition: Rick Colhoun, Frankenstein: Lost in Darkness, Wireless Wings Radio Ensemble
Outstanding Direction: Mindy Parfitt, The Father, The Search Party
Outstanding Production: The Father, The Search Party
Outstanding Production - Musical: Company, Raincity Theatre

Significant Artistic Achievement: 

Outstanding ensemble performance: Caitlin Clugston, Graham Coffeng, Nick Fontaine, Janet Gigliotti, Alex Gullason, Warren Kimmel, Steve Maddock, Jennie Neumann, Anthony Santiago, Madeleine Suddaby, Jennifer Suratos, Lindsay Ann Warnock, Jonathan Winsby, Katey Wright; Company, Raincity Theatre
Outstanding transformation of space and audience immersion: Deep into Darkness, Third Wheel Productions
Outstanding musical direction: Sean Bayntun, Herringbone, Patrick Street Productions
Outstanding integrity in casting: Transcripts, Part I: The Women, Zee Zee Theatre and The Frank Theatre, (in partnership with Firehall Arts Centre)

Theatre for Young Audiences

Outstanding Performance: Marlene Ginader, Bad Hats Theatre’s Peter Pan Carousel Theatre for Young People
Outstanding Design: Jay Dodge (Video Design), Iron Peggy, Vancouver International Children’s Festival and Boca del Lupo
Outstanding Artistic Creation: Ian Harmon (Direction), Love You Forever and More, Munsch Beach House Theatre
Outstanding Production: Th’owxiya: The Hungry Feast Dish, Axis Theatre Company
Significant Artistic Achievement: Outstanding stage management, Jillian Perry, Th’owxiya: The Hungry Feast Dish,|Axis Theatre Company

Other

Outstanding Original Script: Jan Derbyshire, Certified, Touchstone Theatre
Critic's Choice Innovation Award: Certified, Touchstone Theatre

Special Awards

Patron of the Arts Awards: Ken Gracie & Phillip Waddell
GVPTA Career Achievement Awards: Wendy Bross Stuart
Sam Payne Award for Most Promising Newcomer: Heather Barr
Mary Phillips Award for Behind-the-Scene Achievement: Conor Moore
Sidney J. Risk Prize for Outstanding Original Script by an Emerging Playwright: Derek Chan, Chicken Girl
Ray Michal Prize for Outstanding Work and/or Body of Work by an Emerging Director: Chris Lam
John Moffat & Larry Lillo Prize: Gerry Mackay
Vancouver Now Presentation and Inclusion Award: Heidi Taylor
Colin Campbell Award for Excellence in Technical Theatre: Elia Kirby
Gordon Armstrong Playwright's Rent Award: Deborah Williams & The Flame

See also
 Elizabeth Sterling Haynes Award
 Dora Mavor Moore Award
 Dora Audience Choice Award
 Floyd S. Chalmers Canadian Play Award

References

External links
Official Jessie Awards website

Theatre in Vancouver
Canadian theatre awards
Awards established in 1982
1982 establishments in British Columbia